Monnington may refer to:

Ernest Monnington Bowden (1860–1904), Irishman who invented the Bowden mechanism
Kurt Adolf Monnington, World War I flying ace credited with eight aerial victories
Walter Thomas Monnington (1902–1976), English painter
Monnington on Wye, village in western Herefordshire, England